James Island (Chile) (Spanish Isla James) is an island in the Chonos Archipelago of Chile. It has an area of 388 km².

See also
 List of islands of Chile

External links
 Islands of Chile @ United Nations Environment Programme 
 World island information @ WorldIslandInfo.com
 South America Island High Points above 1000 meters
 United States Hydrographic Office, South America Pilot (1916)

Chonos Archipelago

es:Archipiélago de los Chonos#Isla James